Vivian Walsh is a children's book author. Her best selling book Olive, the Other Reindeer is based on her real life Jack Russell Terrier. The dog, Olive, was later portrayed (with the voice of Drew Barrymore) in the animated version of the picture book. The TV special was produced by Matt Groening, creator of the Simpsons.

Biography 
Ms. Walsh states that when she lived in New York City, her picture book heroes, like the people around her, were all workaholics. The Mr. Lunch series begins with this line, "Mr. Lunch was very good at chasing birds, in fact he was a professional." Mr. Lunch is a hard working dog who runs a bird-chasing office. Monkey Business is about the first monkey in space. This picture book catches-up with the monkey when he is a middle-aged industrial mogul.

When Vivian Walsh moved to San Francisco her books took on the theme of a diverse community; of everyone getting along despite their differences. In the book Gluey a bunny and a snail (the fastest and slowest animals in the meadow)  become housemates.

Walsh has collaborated with the illustrator J. Otto Seibold. The two have teamed up on books such as Penguin Dreams, which was named a New York Times "Best Illustrated Book". Mr. Lunch Takes a Plane Ride won a Cuffie Award from Publishers Weekly; Mr. Lunch won for most memorable character in a lead role. Olive, the Other Reindeer was a New York Times Bestseller and the movie version was nominated for an Emmy Award.

Books by Vivian Walsh
 Mr. Lunch Takes a Plane Ride (1993), Viking Penguin 
 Mr. Lunch Borrows a Canoe (1994), Viking Penguin 
 Monkey Business (1995), Viking Penguin 
 Free Lunch (1996), Viking Penguin 
 Going to the Getty (1997), Getty Books 
 Olive, The Other Reindeer (1997), Chronicle Books 
 Penguin Dreams (1999), Chronicle Books 
 Gluey (2002), Harcourt Children's Books
 Olive, My Love (2004), Harcourt Children's Books
 June and August (2009), Abrams

Television
 Olive, the Other Reindeer (1999) Fox Films, see IMDb

References

External links
 
 
 

Living people
American children's writers
Year of birth missing (living people)
Place of birth missing (living people)
San Francisco State University alumni